Following is a list of rivers, which are at least partially, if not predominantly located within Poland.

Rivers by length 
For list of rivers in alphabetical order, please use table-sort buttons.

River system 

Baltic Sea

Oder (Odra)
Warta
Ner
Noteć
Drawa
Obra
Prosna
Widawka
Nysa Łużycka
Bóbr
Cegielinka
Diabelnica
Nysa Kłodzka
Świniec
Niemica
Wołcza
Stuchowska Struga
Rega
Parsęta
Wieprza
Słupia
Łeba
Reda
Pasłęka

Baltic Sea
Vistula (Wisła)
Wda
Brda
Drwęca
Bzura
Narew
Wkra
Bug
Biebrza
Pilica
Wieprz
San
Złota
Wisłok
Wisłoka
Nida
Dunajec
Poprad

References 

 
Poland
Rivers